Deh Bar (also Romanized as Deh Bār, Dahbār, and Dehbār) is a village in Jagharq Rural District, Torqabeh District, Torqabeh and Shandiz County, Razavi Khorasan Province, Iran. At the 2006 census, its population was 454, in 124 families.

References 

Populated places in Torqabeh and Shandiz County